Ondřej Benešík (born 27 June 1976) is a Czech politician and member of the Chamber of Deputies for the Christian and Democratic Union – Czechoslovak People's Party (KDU-ČSL) since October 2013.

From 2010 to 2014 he served as mayor of Strání. From 2015 to 2022, he was a deputy chairman of his party. 

Since 2014 he has been a member of the Parliamentary Assembly of the Council of Europe. He also serves as the head of the European Affairs Committee within the Czech parliament, as well as the parliamentary liaison to the United States.

References 

1976 births
KDU-ČSL MPs
Living people
People from Uherské Hradiště
Members of the Chamber of Deputies of the Czech Republic (2017–2021)
Members of the Chamber of Deputies of the Czech Republic (2013–2017)
Members of the Chamber of Deputies of the Czech Republic (2021–2025)
Masaryk University alumni